The Afemai, also spelled Afenmai, are an ethnic group living in the northern part of Edo State, South-South geopolitical zone of Nigeria. Afemai people occupy six local government areas of Edo state: Etsako West, with headquarters in Auchi, Etsako Central, Etsako East, Owan East, Owan West and Akoko Edo. These make up the Edo-North Senatorial District.

Name
The Afemai are also known as the Afenmai, Etsako, Etsakor, Iyekhee, or Yekhee people. In Benin, they are also known as Ivbiosakon people.

Previously the name used by British colonial administration was Kukuruku, supposedly after a battle cry "ku-ku-ruku", now considered derogatory.

Language
The Afenmai language is a Ghotou-Uneme-Yekhee language, belonging to the North-Central branch of Edoid languages. Afemai is closely related to Edo.

Afemai has several documented dialects:

 Auchi ("Yekhee")
 Avainwu (Fugar)
 Aviele
 Ekperi
 Ivhiadaobi
 South Ibie (South Ivbie)
 Uwepa-Uwano (Weppa Wano)
 Uzanu, Anegbette, Udochi, Imiava [Uneme]
 Uzairue.
 Okpameri 
 Owan
 Okpella/Okpekpe/ North Ibie ("Ivie")

History
Afemai is made of several kingdoms and clans (large villages/townships ruled traditionally by monarchs) and many of them seem to have their oral historical versions of the origin of Afemai as well as its starting point in history. Historical accounts claimed that they migrated from Benin, during the tyrannical rule of Oba Ewuare, the greatest warrior legend and the most outstanding king in the history of the Benin Empire. “The title Ewuare (Oworuare), meaning "all is well" or the trouble has ceased and as a result, the war is over. The title symbolizes an epoch of reconciliation, reconstruction, and the return of peace among the warring factions in Benin between 1435 and 1440 AD.

Shortly after this critical period of war, Akalaka and his two sons Ekpeye and Ogba migrated further southeast to first settle at Ula-Ubie, and subsequently other groups moved out of Benin City and migrated north. However, it has recently become clear that there were people living in Afemai land prior to the migration from Benin City.

Notable People from Afemai 
Some of the most celebrated sons and daughters of Afemai land, past, and present are

;
 Rear Admiral Mike Okhai Akhigbe Former Chief Of General Staff and Vice President
 Dele Giwa Journalist and Human Rights Activist
 Alfred Yarduat Director CBN
Dr. Jeffrey Obomeghie, Nigerian-American educator, motivational speaker, and writer
 Mike Agbedor Ozekhome SAN Human Rights and Constitutional Lawyer
 Rev Dr. Emmanuel A. Akpeokhai (The first trained Pharmacist in Afemai Land)
 Hon Prince Clement Agba, Environmental commissioner under Governor Adams Oshiomhole.
 Inusa Oshogwemoh Polo Club
 Senator Engineer Yisa Braimoh Two Time Senator 
 Dr Austine Obozuwa: Former lecturer Faculty of Law University of Lagos, Former Legal Adviser to the Senate President (Joseph Wayas), Two time Commissioner Bendel State, Former Member House of Representatives(Etsako Federal Constituency),
 Group Captain Brai Ayonote Mni, The 1st Vice President of the African Olympic committee, The Chairman of NABA Nigerian Amateur Boxing Association and former DOPRI Director of public relations and information of the Nigerian Airforce. The Afeakhuye of Uzairue.
Michael Imoudu, a former labour union leader and founder of the Nigeria state,
Chief Julius Momo Udochi the first Nigerian ambassador to the United States,
Gen. George Agbazika Innih, one-time military governor of Bendel and Kwara States,
Major General Abdul Rahman Mamudu, former commander, Nigerian Army Signals Corps and military administrator Gongola State,
Rt Hon Sir ColonelTunde Akogun, former Sole administrator for culture and archives, also former House Leader, Federal House of Representatives
Sir Pa Hudson Arikalume Momodu, MBE, leader of the National Labour Congress Union for the Nigerian War Workers department, who received the ADC hands medal] from His Excellency on behalf of Her Majesty Queen Elizabeth II)
John Momoh (Chairman/CEO of Channels Television )
Adams Oshiomhole, past president of the Nigeria Labour Congress and Past governor of Edo State former Chairman ALL PROGRESSIVE CONGRESS (APC)
Sule Okponobi Director Foreign Exchange CBN
Pa Johnson Jimoh Iyere, 
Raymond Aleogho Dokpesi,(chairman/CEO Africa Independent Television),
Kingsley Momoh,(Journalist, former Editor, Bisi Olatilo Show Magazine and CEO Guguru FM)
Senator Francisca Afegbua, first Nigerian female senator, elected in
Chief Inu Umoru, chairman/CEO, Setraco Ltd,
Hon. Justice J. Omo-Eboh (Court of Appeal);
Prince Tony Momoh, former Minister of Information and Culture, 
Commander Anthony Ikhazoboh, minister of sports and transport, 
Prince Fidelis Oyogoa (SNR), acclaimed former tennis coach at Port Washington Academy, who trained the likes of John McEnroe and Peter Fleming renowned Real Estate developer, 
Aret Adams GMD NNPC, 
Senator Domingo Alaba Obende
Ogedengbe Chief Prudence 
Ex-chief of general staff and ambassador Abdulaziz Garuba etc. 
Major David O. Odiwo
Ambassador Adamu Azimeyeh Emozozo, Former Career Ambassador to Brazil, concurrently accredited to Bolivia and Paraguay. 
Senator Francis Alimikhena.
Lt. Col. Abiodun Uwadia RTD.  Former Senior Special Assistant to the President (Special Duties) 
Dele Momodu journalist/publisher, businessman, philanthropist and motivational speaker.
Alhaji Sule Abu, Director of JohnHolt, The First African Man to be elected as a director.
Chief Mike Aiyegbeni Oghiadomhe was the Deputy Governor of Edo State, Nigeria from 1999 to 2007 and Chief of Staff to former Nigerian President Goodluck Jonathan from 2011 to 2014.
 Augustine Oyarekhua Alegeh, SAN. President Nigerian Bar Association 2014 - 2016 
Aikhunegbe Anthony Malik, SAN. Adididi of Auchi Sacred Kingdom, Chairman Nigeria Football Federation Electoral Committee 2022 
Festus Oisawereme Egwaikhide, Professor of Economics, University of Ibadan
Oshiotse Andrew Okwilagwe, first Nigerian Professor of Publishing, University of Ibadan

Government
The Afemais do not have a central traditional ruler. However, some of the prominent traditional institutions and rulers in Afemai land are the Okumagbe of Weppa Wanno (Agenebode), Ogieneni of Uzairue (Jattu), Aidonogie of south Ibie, Otaru of Auchi, Oba of Agbede, Otaru of Igarra, Ukor of Ihievbe,  Oliola of Anegbette, Okumagbe of Iuleha clan, Okuopellagbe of Okpella etc. 

Afemai have produced many illustrious personalities in both national and international levels.

Tourist attractions, which span the expanse of Afemai, are exemplified by the Ise Lake in Agenebode (Weppa Wanno clan) Etsakor East, the Ososo hills (featured in an edition of Gulder Ultimate search), the famous Kukuruku hills and the Somorika hills in Akoko Edo. Somorika hills consist of an extended expanse of hills crowned by massive boulders perched precariously on the summits of hills and alongside seemingly inadequate locations on the sides.

Some of the most important towns/clans in Afemai land are Agenebode(Weppa-Wanno), Weppa, Oshiolo, Emokwemhe Iviagbapue, Auchi, Ihievbe, Afuze, Anegbette, Warrake, Iviukwe, South Ibie, Agbede, Sabongida Ora, Igarra, Ekperi, Jattu, Fugar, Aviele, Okpella, Uneme Ehrunrun, Uneme Osu, Iviukhua, Ososo, Uzanu, Uzebba, Iviukhua, Weppa, Okpella, Okpekpe, Somorika etc.

The autonomous clans, towns, villages and kingdoms in Afemai land are currently administratively arranged as follows under the current six local government areas:

 Etsako East LGA, Agenebode:
Agenebode, Oshiolo, Iviagbapue,  Imiakebu, Afana, Imiegba, Itsukwi, Emokweme, Ekwothor, Iviukhua, Okpella, Okpekpe, Iviebua, Ibie, Weppa, Uzanu City

 Etsako Central LGA, Fugar:
Fugar, Ekperi, Ogbona, Anegbette, Udochi

 Estako West LGA, Auchi:
Auchi, South Ibie, Agbede, Awain Community( Ewora, Eware, Ibvioba, Ama, Idegun, etc.)  Jattu, Afashio, Ayogwiri, Aviele, Iyorah, Ikabigbo, Afowa, Irekpai, Ugbenor, Idato,

 Owan East LGA, Afuze
Afuze, Warrake, Igue, Ihievbe, Ikao, Ivbi-Mion, Ive-Ada-Obi, Otuo and Uokha

 Owan West LGA, Sabongida Ora:
Sabongida Ora, Iuleha Clan

 Akoko Edo LGA, Igarra:
Igarra, Ibillo, Uneme Osu, Uneme Ehrunrun, Ojah, Ososo, Somorika,

Aviawun (Iviawu) is one of the popular clans in Afemai.  It comprises
1 Unone
2 Arua
3 Ogbona
4 Iriakhor

Awun is the father of Unone Arua Ogbona Iriakhor and Awun migrated from Benin Kingdom and settle in the present Fugar. Unone and Arua make up the present Fugar.

Religion

The Etsako people were originally practitioners of the African Traditional Religion. However, with advent of Christianity and Islam, many got converted to those religions.  Etsako people have relatively large Christians today, perhaps due to the largely arrival of the early missionaries at the Waterside in Agenebode. However Afemai are predominantly Muslims with significant concentration around Auchi, Agbede, Owans, and the Okpella axis.

Notes

External links
 Edo state tourism at Edo world

Ethnic groups in Nigeria
Edo State